Manoba munda is a moth in the family Nolidae. It was described by Joseph de Joannis in 1928. It is found in Vietnam.

References

Natural History Museum Lepidoptera generic names catalog

Moths described in 1928
Nolinae